is a Japanese economist, central banker and the 30th Governor of the Bank of Japan (BOJ), and professor at Aoyama Gakuin University. He is also a Director and Vice-Chairman of the Bank for International Settlements (BIS).

Early life
Shirakawa was born in Fukuoka. and he graduated from high school in Kokura.

In 1972, he was awarded a B.A. degree at the University of Tokyo. In 1977, he earned an M.A. in Economics at the University of Chicago.

Career
Shirakawa joined the Bank of Japan in 1972. His varied assignments at the bank included a period as General Manager at the Ōita branch.  For a time, he was General Manager for the Americas at the bank's office in New York City.

Shirakawa joined the faculty of the graduate school of public policy at Kyoto University in 2006.  He returned to BOJ in 2008.

His nomination to be Governor of the Bank  was approved on April 9, 2008. Masaaki ranks 6th on the world's most powerful by Newsweek along with economic triumvirs Ben Bernanke (4th) and Jean-Claude Trichet (5th).

Shirakawa's mandate is "to respond to changes in circumstances in a flexible and timely manner" in a way which can contribute to the sustainable growth and development of Japan. In other words, this means that the role of the head of the BOJ is to effect price stability in Japan and to ensure stability of the financial system.

In 2011 he was included in the 50 Most Influential ranking of Bloomberg Markets Magazine. He is a member in the Group of Thirty.

In 2013 he accepted a professor post at Aoyama Gakuin University.

Selected works
In a statistical overview derived from writings by and about Masaaki Shirakawa, OCLC/WorldCat encompasses roughly 10+ works in 20+ publications in 3 languages and 110+ library holdings.

 The Monetary Approach to the Balance of Payments and the Exchange Rate: an Empirical Study of Japan's Case (1980)
 図說日本銀行 (1993)
 Financial Market Globalization: Present and Future (1997)
 The Asset Price Bubble and Monetary Policy: Japan's Experience in the Late 1980s and the Lessons (2000)
 "One Year Under Quantitative Easing" (2002)
 Japan's Deflation, Problems in the Financial System and Monetary Policy (2005)
 De-leveraging and Growth: Is the Developed World Following Japan's Long and Winding Road? (2012)
 Tumultuous Times: Central Banking in an Era of Crisis (2021)

Notes

External links

Deputy Governor Bank of Japan retrieved April 8, 2008
Highlights 4-Remarks by BOJ nominees Shirakawa and Watanabe Reuters retrieved April 8, 2008
白川・渡辺両氏から所信聴取 NHK retrieved April 8, 2008
小沢氏に振り回される福田首相　日銀人事めぐり (1/2ページ) – MSN産経ニュース MSN Sankei News retrieved April 8, 2008
白川日銀総裁の同意決定へ＝民主 | 時事ドットコム  Jiji Press retrieved April 8, 2008
(webcast only) The Way out of Economic and Financial Crisis: Lessons and Actions Masaaki Shirakawa addresses the current global economic crisis and offer lessons from Japan’s recent experience.

1949 births
Living people
Economy of Japan
Governors of the Bank of Japan
Group of Thirty
Japanese economists
Academic staff of Kyoto University
People from Kitakyushu
University of Chicago alumni
University of Tokyo alumni